A video portal is a website offering user created or professionally created video content.

Online video
Online video is video content distributed by the Internet. Recently, several different studies have shown that, at least in the United States, online video reaches a majority of the population.

This is due in part to the penetration of broadband internet, and also to the emergence of highly successful video portals. These portals offer user created or professionally created content.

The majority of online videos are shorter than 5 minutes in duration, a length generally preferred by users who view such content on computers or portable equipment, like cellphones, MP3 players or video game consoles.

Some portals offer videos in the 320x240 pixel resolution, while others opt for a larger format, such as 480x360 pixels (for a typical display) and 640x360 (for a widescreen 16:9 display).

Many portals use Adobe Flash Player for their videos, the player which is becoming a de facto industry standard. Others use Windows Media Player, QuickTime, DivX Web Player or RealPlayer.

Devices like Apple TV or Netgear's Digital Entertainer, capable of transferring video files from the Internet to the television screen, will cause an increase in the length of the size of videos, both in definition and duration.

Most video portals generate their revenue through advertising. There are currently many advertising formats related to online video, such as preroll (commercials like those on television and played before the video) and branded channels.

External links
 Comprehensive and up-to-date list of science video portals
 Video Portal Example

See also
 Video hosting service

Video hosting

de:Videoportal